is a song recorded by Japanese singer Misia. It was released by Ariola Japan as the fourth single from her twelfth studio album, Love Bebop (2016) on 8 July 2015, one day after Misia's 37th birthday. The song was co-written by Misia and Ki-Yo, composed by the latter and produced by Hiroshi Matsui. "Anata ni Smile :)" was used in television ads for Kirin's Sekai no Kitchen Kara tea, for which a special version with alternate lyrics was recorded. The digital single artwork was painted by author, screenwriter, director and painter Ellie Omiya.

Background and release
The instrumentation for the track was recorded at Luminous Sound Studio in Dallas, Texas. The song features the gospel choir United Voices. The choir arrangement was produced by Myron Butler, who also directed the ensemble. The vocals were recorded and mixed at Rhythmedia Studio, in Tokyo, Japan. "Anata ni Smile :)" was first performed in concert on 11 June 2015. The song was released as a digital double A-side single, alongside the song "Nagareboshi" on 8 July 2015. A CD single was issued on 29 August 2015 for limited rental in Tsutaya stores exclusively. This release included two bonus live recordings from Misia's 2 April 2014 concert at the Bunkamura Orchard Hall of the songs "Boku wa Pegasus Kimi wa Polaris" and "One Day, One Life", from the album New Morning (2014).

Composition
"Anata ni Smile :)" was co-written by Misia and Ki-Yo and produced by Hiroshi Matsui. Set to an uptempo R&B track and accompanied by a gospel choir in the background, Misia sings about expressing love through a smile. The song is written in the key of E flat major. Misia's vocals span from B3 to F5 in modal voice, and up to B5 in head voice.

Chart performance
"Anata ni Smile :)" entered at number 81 on the Billboard Japan Radio Songs chart and at number 4 on the weekly RecoChoku Albums Chart.

Track listing

Credits and personnel
Recording
Recorded at: Luminous Sound Studio, Dallas, Texas; Rhythmedia Studio, Tokyo, Japan.
Mixed at: Rhythmedia Studio in Tokyo, Japan.

Personnel
Misia – lead vocals, songwriting
Myron Butler – choir arrangement and direction
DJ Gomi – oversea direction
David Guy – trumpet
Ian Hendrickson – sax
Roy Hendrickson – engineering
Masahiro Kawaguchi – engineering, mixing
Ki-Yo – songwriting
Hiroshi Matsui – additional instrumentation, producer, programming
United Voices – choir
Kenta Yonesaka – engineering

Charts

References

External links
 

2015 songs
2015 singles
Misia songs
Songs written by Misia
Ariola Japan singles
Songs written by Ki-Yo